Mount Hope College may refer to:
Mount Hope College (Ohio) a defunct college at Rogers, Ohio.
Mount Hope College (Maryland) a defunct college that was located at what was then the external boundaries of Baltimore, Maryland.